Kathleen Ingels (December 31, 1882 – July 14, 1958) was an American sculptor. Her work was part of the sculpture event in the art competition at the 1932 Summer Olympics.

References

1882 births
1958 deaths
American women sculptors
Canadian emigrants to the United States
Olympic competitors in art competitions
People from Old Toronto
20th-century American sculptors
20th-century American women artists